Abraham Joseph Hasbrouck (October 16, 1773 – January 12, 1845) was a United States representative from New York and a slaveholder.

Biography
Hasbrouck was born in "Guilford" (now Libertyville in Gardiner), Ulster County, New York.  He was privately tutored and moved to Kingston in 1795, engaging in mercantile pursuits.

He was one of the incorporators of the Delaware & Hudson Canal, and was appointed a first lieutenant of Cavalry in the New York Militia.

He was organizer and director of the Middle District Bank of Kingston and served in the New York State Assembly in 1811. Hasbrouck was elected as a Democratic-Republican to the Thirteenth Congress, holding office from March 4, 1813, to March 3, 1815; he was not a candidate for renomination in 1814.

He engaged in freighting goods to New York City by water. He was a member of the New York State Senate in 1822.

He died in Kingston in 1845 died in Kingston, and was buried at the Albany Avenue Cemetery.

Hasbrouck's cousin, Abraham Bruyn Hasbrouck, was also a U.S. Representative from New York.

Both Abraham Joseph Hasbrouck and Abraham Bruyn Hasbrouck are descendants of the Hasbroucks who founded New Paltz in 1678.  The Hasbroucks were Huguenots, Protestant followers of John Calvin who fled what is today Northern France and South Belgium who fled persecution by the ruling Catholics.  The original settlement of their ancestors survives today as Historic Huguenot Street, a National Historic Landmark District.

References

Sources

External links
 Historic Huguenot Street
 Hasbrouck Family Association

1773 births
1845 deaths
Hasbrouck family
Politicians from Kingston, New York
Members of the New York State Assembly
New York (state) state senators
Democratic-Republican Party members of the United States House of Representatives from New York (state)